Fra Martín Garzés (1526 − 7 February 1601) was a Spanish knight of Aragon who served as the 53rd Grand Master of the Order of Malta, between 1595 and 1601. He became the Grand Master of the Order after the death of Hugues Loubenx de Verdalle. His suit of armour is found in the Palace Armoury at Valletta.

External links
 Coins of Grandmaster Martin Garzez

Grand Masters of the Knights Hospitaller
Garzez, Fra' Martin
16th-century Spanish people
1526 births
1601 deaths
Burials at Saint John's Co-Cathedral